The 1958–59 European Cup*1958–59 FIBA Women's European Champions Cup was the inaugural edition of the premier European women's basketball competition for clubs. Nine teams took part in the competition, representing Bulgaria, Czechoslovakia, France, East Germany, West Germany, Poland, Romania, the Soviet Union and Yugoslavia.

It was the first of three editions won by Bulgarian teams, as Slavia Sofia defeated Dynamo Moscow in a two-legged final to bring the first ever European Cup to the Balkans.

Results

Qualification round

Quarterfinals

Semifinals

Final

References 

Champions Cup
European
European
EuroLeague Women seasons